The Hauntening is a radio sitcom written and created by Tom Neenan and directed and produced by David Tyler. It is centred around the dangerous potential of modern technology, and stars Tom Neenan and Jenny Bede.

The programme was first broadcast on BBC Radio 4 in 2017. In 2019, the second series was nominated for a Writers Guild of Great Britain award for Best Radio Comedy. In 2021, Jenny Bede was nominated for a BBC Audio Drama Award for Best Supporting Performance for playing Heidi.

Overview

The Hauntening is a radio comedy series written by and starring Tom Neenan, and produced by Pozzitive Television.

Reception

The Cambridge Geek wrote that "it packs a lot into the quarter hour, and you'll almost certainly enjoy it", and Exciting Stuff wrote that it was "new and fresh, and one to put on your must-listen list".

Episode list

Series one

Series two

Series three

Series four

References 

British radio comedy